Shattuc is an unincorporated community in Clinton County, Illinois, United States. Shattuc once had a post office, which closed on September 28, 2002.

Schools:

Shattuc children are bused to and from the Carlyle Community School system, located in Carlyle, Illinois.

References

Unincorporated communities in Clinton County, Illinois
Unincorporated communities in Illinois